Carveth "Carv" Thompson (October 25, 1932 – August 11, 2021) was an American former politician in the state of South Dakota. A Republican, he served in the South Dakota House of Representatives from 1968 to 1972, and was the Republican nominee in 1972 South Dakota gubernatorial election. He was born in Faith, South Dakota.

References

1932 births
2021 deaths
Republican Party members of the South Dakota House of Representatives
Businesspeople from South Dakota
People from Faith, South Dakota